The Wippra Dam or Wipper Dam ( or Wippertalsperre, partly also Vorsperre Wippra or Vorsperre Wipper) is a dam on the river Wipper in the Harz mountains. It lies near Wippra, not far from Mansfeld and Hettstedt in Saxony-Anhalt. It was built between February 1951 and November 1952.

It was built in order to ensure the supply of industrial water to the copper-processing plants in Mansfeld and Hettstedt. Its role in flood protection is rather limited because it was originally only built as an auxiliary dam. Plans for a bigger main dam further down the valley never came to fruition. The Wipper Dam also generates electricity using hydropower. The rated capacity of the power station is 22 kW.

Its operator is Talsperrenbetrieb Saxony-Anhalt.

The barrier itself is a gravity dam made of  concrete. Guided tours of the inside of the dam are available.

On the dam is checkpoint no. 219 in the Harzer Wandernadel hiking system.

Impressions of Wippra Reservoir

See also 
 List of dams and reservoirs in Germany
 List of dams in the Harz

External links 
 Talsperrenbetrieb Saxony-Anhalt
 The Wippra Dam

Dams in the Harz
Mansfeld-Südharz
Dams in Saxony-Anhalt
Dams completed in 1952